Dunckerocampus is a genus of pipefishes one of two genera known as the flagtail pipefishes. This genus is native to the Indian and Pacific Oceans where they are usually found in reef environments. Their tail is red with a whitish edge, and in some species there is a white or yellow spot in the center. All except D. baldwini have vertical red/brown and yellow/white stripes on their body.

Species
There are currently seven recognized species in this genus:
 Dunckerocampus baldwini Herald & J. E. Randall, 1972 (Redstripe pipefish)
 Dunckerocampus boylei Kuiter, 1998 (Broad-banded Pipefish)
 Dunckerocampus chapmani Herald, 1953 (Glowtail pipefish)
 Dunckerocampus dactyliophorus (Bleeker, 1853) (Ringed pipefish)
 Dunckerocampus multiannulatus (Regan, 1903) (Many-banded pipefish)
 Dunckerocampus naia G. R. Allen & Kuiter, 2004
 Dunckerocampus pessuliferus Fowler, 1938 (Yellowbanded pipefish)

References

 
Marine fish genera
Taxa named by Gilbert Percy Whitley